Justice Manning may refer to:

Amos R. Manning (1810–1880), associate justice of the Alabama Supreme Court
James S. Manning (1859–1938), associate justice of the North Carolina Supreme Court
Randolph Manning (1804–1864), associate justice of the Michigan Supreme Court
Thomas Courtland Manning (1825–1887), chief justice of the Louisiana Supreme Court